Shubh Mangal Saavdhan is a 2017 Indian Hindi-language romantic comedy film directed by R. S. Prasanna and produced by Krishika Lulla and Aanand L. Rai. Starring Ayushmann Khurrana and Bhumi Pednekar, it is the remake of the director's own Tamil film Kalyana Samayal Saadham (2013). Released on 1 September 2017, the film revolves around Mudit Sharma, who is about to get married, on how he deals with his erectile dysfunction with his fiancé and family.

At the 63rd Filmfare Awards, Shubh Mangal Saavdhan received 5 nominations, including Best Actor (Khurrana), Best Actress (Pednekar) and Best Supporting Actress (Pahwa). 

A spiritual successor titled Shubh Mangal Zyada Saavdhan, also starring Khurrana in the lead and Pednekar in a cameo appearance, was released on 21 February 2020.

Plot 
The story is about Mudit Sharma (Ayushmann Khurrana), a Delhi boy with a marketing job, and Sugandha Joshi (Bhumi Pednekar), a Gurgaon girl whom Mudit falls in love with. Shy by nature, Mudit tries all possible ways to talk to Sugandha but fails. Finally, he decides to send her an online marriage proposal. When the two finally meet, they feel the sparks and decide to take it to the next level. Sugandha takes her time deciding whether to accept the proposal and later calls it her first major decision for her own life. A formal marriage proposal is exchanged between their families.

When Sugandha's parents are out of town, Mudit and Sugandha try getting intimate and when they finally reach the bed, a visibly uncomfortable Mudit declares that he needs to use the washroom. But when he returns, he gets dressed and makes for the main door. When a concerned Sugandha asks him about this sudden change of plans, he simply hints at his problem with the help of a biscuit, getting Sugandha to realize that he is facing a bout of erectile dysfunction.

Mudit and Sugandha try different ways to solve the problem but fail, and when Mudit comes face to face with the reality of his impending marriage, he decides to cancel it. They argue. Now deeply in love, Sugandha refuses to cancel the wedding and says she will expect him and his baaraat (wedding procession) at the venue.

Eventually, accompanied by a posse of assorted relatives, Mudit leaves for Haridwar where the marriage is scheduled to take place. During the journey, Mudit constantly receives calls from someone stating that he is a well-wisher and knows about his problem. When he reaches Haridwar and the calls continue, Sugandha takes the call and showers abuses on the unknown person before suddenly realizing that the well-wisher is none other than Sugandha's father.

Mudit's future father-in-law takes him to consult with a veterinarian who suggests that the cause is stress. A day prior to the wedding, Sugandha and Mudit try getting intimate one more time, egged on by relatives from both sides of the family. When they exit the room sometime later, they find every family member waiting expectantly about Mudit having done 'it'. Mudit says that he managed to perform but Sugandha disagrees. The families are now deeply worried.

As the hour of the wedding approaches and troubles and disagreements pile on, Mudit stands up for Sugandha and their relationship against family/societal expectations. He even risks his life to stand up for the love of his life, Sugandha. He rejects toxic masculinity and they together define their marriage as a team of equal players. The wedding takes place.

In the closing narration, Sugandha says that nothing happened (i.e. Mudit still presumably had erectile dysfunction) on the first night or their honeymoon and then, they simply got busy with their lives. And one fine day, it simply happened, even as the whole family was busy in a pooja (prayer ceremony).

Cast 
Ayushmann Khurrana as Mudit Sharma, Sugandha's husband 
Bhumi Pednekar as Sugandha Sharma (née Joshi), Mudit's wife
Brijendra Kala as Sugandha's uncle
Sanjay Singh as Ajit
Neeraj Sood as Sugandha's father
Seema Bhargava as Vimla, Sugandha's mother
Chittaranjan Tripathy as Mudit's father
Supriya Shukla as Mudit's mother
Anmol Bajaj as Anu
Rahul Chauhan as Mudit's uncle Gabloo Chacha
Shubhankarfft Tripathi 
Anshul Chauhan as Ginni
Gopal Datt as veterinary doctor
Gulzar Dastur as Store Clerk
Jimmy Sheirgill as himself in a guest appearance
Mrinal as God
Ayush Sehgal as kite flying youngster
Mihir as God-2

Production
The film was extensively shot in Delhi, Rishikesh and Haridwar. Anshul Chauhan was hired to play Bhumi Pednekar's best friend in the film.

Soundtrack 

The music of the film is composed by Tanishk Bagchi and Vayu, who also wrote the lyrics for the songs. The first track of the film "Rocket Saiyyan" sung by Ritu Pathak, Brijesh Shandilya and Bagchi was released on 7 August 2017. The second song "Laddoo" sung by Mika Singh and it was released on 21 August 2017. The soundtrack consists of five songs and was released on 25 August 2017.

All songs were written and composed by Tanishk-Vayu.

Reception

Critical response

Rajeev Masand of News18 praised the performances of the leading pair, Ayushmann Khurana & Bhumi Pednekar, and concluded his review by saying that, "Shubh Mangal Saavdhan rises above its minor problems to deliver plenty laughs. It’s one of the year’s most enjoyable films" and gave the film . Neil Soans of The Times of India gave the film  praising the performances of the actors and the humor of the film but found the climax of the movie to be a letdown. Ananya Bhattacharya of India Today praised the movie saying, "This is easily one of the best films that Bollywood has given us in 2017. Shubh Mangal Saavdhan does not fall flat. It flies" and gave the film . Sweta Kaushal of Hindustan Times gave the film a   saying that, "Prasanna presents Shubh Mangal Saavdhan in a rather flat manner and refuses to give space to characters other than the hero and heroine, leaving behind one mess of what could have been a fun-filled entertainer." Shubhra Gupta of The Indian Express gave the film  saying that, "overall this comedy of middle-class-Dilli-manners-and-mores suffers from a sit-com flatness, and a sagging climax."

Awards and nominations

Shubh Mangal Zyada Saavdhan 
Following the commercial success of the film, a spiritual successor titled Shubh Mangal Zyada Saavdhan was announced which is based on homosexuality. Ayushmann Khurrana, the lead actor plays a gay man in the film. A teaser was released on 9 May 2019 giving the theme of the film. The film was initially slated to release on 13 March 2020, but the release was pushed up to 21 February 2020.

References

External links 
 
 

2017 films
2017 romantic comedy-drama films
2010s sex comedy films
Films set in Delhi
Indian romantic comedy-drama films
Films scored by Tanishk Bagchi
Indian sex comedy films
Films shot in Delhi
Hindi remakes of Tamil films
Films scored by Tanishk-Vayu
Films shot in Uttarakhand
Films set in Uttarakhand